LAUGFS Holdings Limited is a diversified conglomerate from Sri Lanka and has since expanded overseas. Laugfs Holdings is mainly engaged in Energy, retail, Industrial and manufacturing, Hospitality, Real estate, logistics, pharmaceuticals and several other sectors.

Sectors

Power and energy 
LAUGFS Gas PLC is a publicly listed company engaged in downstream activities and Liquid Petroleum Gas (LPG) related activities. Created in 2001 when the Sri Lankan government liberalized the LPG industry it soon expanded and was listed in the Colombo Stock Exchange in 2010.

LAUGFS Power is engaged in power generation from renewable sources such as Solar and Hydro.

LAUGFS Petroleum (Pvt) Limited was incorporated in 2004 as a fully owned subsidiary of LAUGFS Holdings as the petroleum industries were liberalized. LAUGFS Petroleum has a network of filling stations in Sri Lanka serving over 30,000 customers a day.

LAUGFS Lubricants Limited is a fully owned subsidiary of LAUGFS Holdings to produce automobile and industrial lubricant and oil products. In 2008 it launched the LAUGFS Oil brand and in 2016 a Tribology Park was created in Nittambuwa for Research and Development of new products

LAUGFS Gas Bangladesh was created in 2015 after LAUGFS Gas acquired a controlling stake in Petredec Elpiji in Bangladesh and was fully consolidated in 2016. It has an LPG import, bottling and distribution facility in Mongla Port with a storage capacity of 1800MT which is being expanded to 2200MT and satellite filling stations in different parts of Bangladesh are being built. LAUGFS Gas hopes to invest around $120 million in Bangladesh during the first four years and since LAUGFS gas's entry into the Bangladesh market freight charge for LPG has been reduced from 170-200 USD per tonne to 110-100 USD per tonne.

SLOGAL Energy DMCC was created in 2016 SLOGAL Energy DMCC is a fully-owned subsidiary headquartered in Dubai. It was created to further strengthen LAUGFS’s global energy presence and expand to the middle eastern markets. While primarily focused on energy trading, SLOGAL also offers a broad portfolio of maritime services including acquiring, managing, operating and chartering of LPG vessels.

Gas Auto Lanka was created in 1995 to convert vehicles to Auto gas and run auto gas stations in Sri Lanka

Retail and consumer 
LAUGFS Supermarket was created in February 2001 as a 24-hour supermarket chain of LAUGFS and the first supermarket chain to introduce the 24-hour concept to Sri Lanka. Some supermarkets of the chain have facilities such as bakeries, pharmacies, E-channeling services, utility bill payment facilities, free Wi-Fi and ATM facilities. It is also a part of the Sri Lanka Retailers’ Association (SLRA).

SunUp Ceylon Tea (Pvt) Ltd was established in 2010 to expand the presence in consumer retailing for SunUp tea brand which comes in Strong, Black, Kahata and Green Tea varieties.

LAUGFS Beverages entered the beverages industry in 2003, marketing bottled drinking water with a range of SKUs from 500ml to 19L.  It continues to expand with a growing network of distributors and a modern bottling plant with a capacity of 35,000 bottles a day.

LAUGFS Restaurants (Pvt) Ltd owns and operates the JADE chain of Chinese restaurants in Sri Lanka opened in 2006. It provides dine-in, take-away and in limited areas a door-to-door delivery service.

Established in 2014, LAUGFS International is the trading arm of LAUGFS Holdings. It is the authorised agent in Sri Lanka for Yamaha Motors, for their Power Products, and for AIRMAN products.

Lfinity (Pvt) Limited is LAUGFS’s online retail arm, operating a range of e-commerce sites such as clicknshop.lk a virtual shopping mall and grocerypal.lk an online grocery store. Delivery services are free of charge within Colombo.

Industrial and manufacturing 
LAUGFS Engineering (Pvt) Ltd engages in steel fabrication operating a manufacturing facility, building construction, designing and erecting steel structures including pre-fabricated steel buildings as well as the designing and manufacturing of high capacity pressure vessels such as LP gas storage tanks.

LAUGFS Salt and Chemicals Ltd engages in the production of common salt and value added products.

LAUGFS Corporation (Rubber) Ltd, established in 2008, produces various types of tyres as well as custom-designed tyres. LAUGFS tyres are exported to over 25 countries including the USA, Canada, Spain, Italy, France, Belgium, Germany, Russia, the Middle East, Singapore and India.

Services 
LAUGFS Eco Sri provides Vehicle Emission Testing (VET) services and eco-services to reduce emissions. It has a network of over 100 testing centres and 150 mobile locations and it also offers specialized emission testing for industrial clients to achieve high green standards.

LAUGFS Higher Education Services (LAHES) is the education and training arm of LAUGFS. It offers a range of undergraduate, postgraduate and skill development programs. LAHES is affiliated with several international universities such as the Executive MSc in HRM from the Asia e University, and Australian undergraduate programs offered in partnership with ATMC.

LAUGFS Car Care is a subdivision of LAUGFS Lubricants Ltd. It is engaged in auto maintenance offering services from car washes to specialized services.

Hospitality and leisure 
Laugfs Leisure Limited (LLL) operates as the leisure arm of Laugfs Holdings in the hospitality industry developing luxury resorts and hotels under the brand name "Anantaya" (infinity in Sinhala). The maiden luxury resort was launched in Chilaw in early 2014.

Real estate 
LAUGFS Property Developers engages in the real estate development projects. Its first commercial property is at Maya Avenue, Colombo 6. The 10-storeyed office complex with a total floor area of 85,000 sq ft is also the head office of the majority of LAUGFS subsidiaries.

Logistics 
LAUGFS Maritime Services (Pvt) Ltd is a ship-owning and management company established in the year 2014 in Sri Lanka. It operates a fleet of LPG carriers providing Liquefied petroleum gas transportation & logistic services regionally. LAUGFS plans to increase the fleet to 20 LPG carriers

LAUGFS Terminals Ltd owns the largest LPG Transshipment Terminal in South Asia located at Hambantota International Port. The current terminal has a capacity of 30,000 MT which will be expanded to 45,000MT in the future.

References 

Conglomerate companies of Sri Lanka
Privately held companies of Sri Lanka
Sri Lankan companies established in 1995
Conglomerate companies established in 1995
Oil and gas companies of Sri Lanka